The Hindenburgdamm or Hindenburg Dam is an 11 km-long causeway joining the North Frisian island of Sylt to mainland Schleswig-Holstein. It was opened on 1 June 1927 and is exclusively a railway corridor. The companies that built the Hindenburgdamm, a job that took four years, were Philipp Holzmann AG of Frankfurt, working from the mainland, and Peter Fix Söhne of Duisburg working from Sylt. A train trip along the causeway takes about 10 minutes, and the time between the auto terminals at Niebüll on the mainland and Westerland on Sylt is about 30 minutes. The Hindenburgdamm is part of the railway line known as the Marschbahn ("Marsh Railway"), which is double-tracked along much of the route, although there as yet exists a single-tracked stretch. On the causeway is a signal box. The rail line is not electrified making the use of diesel locomotives necessary. Trains coming from origins further south like Hamburg change from an electric locomotive to a diesel locomotive at Itzehoe.

Every day, more than 100 trains pass over the causeway, 50 of those ferrying cars (there is no road link to Sylt). Each year, the railway ferries more than 450,000 vehicles over the causeway.

The causeway, which bears the Weimar Republic Reichspräsident Paul von Hindenburg's name, has interrupted the tidal flow, which until the causeway's appearance had flowed freely between Sylt and the mainland. This change in tides, it is believed, is part of what has led to the loss of a certain amount of land at Sylt's southern end.

The causeway lies in the specially protected Zone I of the Schleswig-Holsteinisches Wattenmeer National Park. Walks on the tidal flats are not allowed here, although they are quite popular elsewhere.

Situation before the causeway was built 
After the Second War of Schleswig in 1864, when Prussia took over Schleswig from Denmark, Sylt and Westerland belonged to the new Tondern district. The seaside bathing town of Westerland gradually grew in popularity. The west coast railway already ran from Altona by way of Husum and Niebüll to Tønder (then also in Germany and called Tondern). From here, the tracks were extended to the port at the Hoyerschleuse, whence paddlesteamers ran to Munkmarsch harbour on Sylt.

The connection was at the tide's mercy, and in winter, the ice in the Wadden Sea formed an impenetrable barrier. Already being planned at that time was a rail causeway from the mainland to Nösse on Sylt. The horrendous cost of such a project kept it shelved for quite a while, until Westerland was raised to town in 1905. Westerland's growing popularity as a seaside resort led in 1910 to serious official planning for the rail causeway.

World War I brought all planning to a stop. After the war, Germany was obliged to cede Tønder and the Hoyerschleuse to Denmark. Sylt remained part of Germany, but owing to the new border, the old route to Sylt was now cut off, except if travellers wanted to go to the trouble of obtaining a Danish visa to make a short trip through Danish territory.

Construction 

Because of this unacceptable situation, construction on the long planned causeway was finally begun by Philipp Holzmann in 1925. Early in the construction, a storm flood swept away what had already been built. After this experience, it was decided to realign the causeway's route somewhat more towards the north. A trenchlike cofferdam was built to facilitate construction. 1,000-1,500 workers were employed on the project. In the two years that it took to build the causeway, more than 3 million cubic metres of sand and clay were moved, and 120,000 tonnes of stones used. It was opened on 1 June 1927.

Rail traffic 
The auto-train car shuttle train terminal in Niebüll is connected to the Autobahnen in Schleswig-Holstein by Federal Highways (Bundesstraßen) B5 and B199.

On 3 September 2009, there was a fatal accident on the Hindenburgdamm when a squall blew a truck off a flatcar in one of the auto-trains. The driver was thrown out of the truck and died at the accident scene.

Namesake 

In the 1960s and 1970s, the name "Hindenburgdamm" came to be criticized, since its namesake was a controversial figure. There were many initiatives to find the causeway a new name, but none of the suggestions (including "Sylt-Damm", "Friedens-Damm" ["Peace Causeway"] and "Friesen-Damm" ["Frisian Causeway"]) won majority support.

Future 
Even though a few on Sylt may call for a road causeway instead of a railway link, it seems unlikely that Deutsche Bahn will be willing to give up this profitable line.

In 2006 rumours came up that the single-tracked stretches of the line (between Niebüll and Klanxbüll and between Morsum and Westerland) were to be extended to double-track. However, these rumours proved to be false. Work started in 2008 at the Lehnshallig crossover merely had the purpose of replacing old equipment.

References

Sources
 Hans Bock: Die Marschbahn von Altona nach Westerland. Boyens, Heide 1989, 

 Erich Staisch: Der Zug nach Norden. Ernst Kabel, Hamburg 1994, 
 Rolf Stumpf: Die Eisenbahn nach Sylt. EK, Freiburg 2003,  (Regionale Verkehrsgeschichte 38)

External links 
 Historic photos from the Hindenburgdamm's construction

Geography of Schleswig-Holstein
Transport in Schleswig-Holstein
Causeways in Europe
Railway lines in Schleswig-Holstein
Paul von Hindenburg
Car shuttle trains